The News-Press is a daily broadsheet newspaper located in Fort Myers, Florida, serving primarily Lee County, as well as parts of Hendry, Collier, and Charlotte Counties.

The paper publishes several editions of its "Local & State" (metro) section for suburban communities, including Bonita Springs, Cape Coral, Lehigh Acres, North Fort Myers, and South Fort Myers.  Further, special sections are published on the paper's Web site, including "Education", "Environment", and "Growth/Development".

The newspaper offers home delivery. Daily, Monday-Saturday, and Sunday-only are the home delivery choices, and delivery is guaranteed by 6am on weekdays and 7am on weekends. The carriers are all independent contractors who must use their own personal property for the job.

The News-Press is owned by the Virginia-based Gannett, which has owned it since 1971.   The News-Press is printed in Stuart, FL along with the Naples Daily News. It has been printed there since May 2021.

References

Further reading

External links 

 
 Today's The News-Press front page at the Newseum

Newspapers published in Florida
Mass media in Fort Myers, Florida
Gannett publications
Publications established in 1884
1884 establishments in Florida